The 2018 Bahrain Grand Prix (formally known as the Formula 1 2018 Gulf Air Bahrain Grand Prix) was a Formula One motor race that took place on 8 April 2018 at the Bahrain International Circuit in Sakhir, Bahrain. The race was the second round of the 2018 FIA Formula One World Championship and marked the 14th time that the Bahrain Grand Prix had been run as a round of the Formula One World Championship.

Sebastian Vettel was the defending race winner. He entered the round with a seven-point lead over Lewis Hamilton in the World Drivers' Championship. In the World Constructors' Championship standings, Ferrari hold a ten-point lead over Mercedes.

Report

Practice 
Daniel Ricciardo was fastest in first practice with Kimi Räikkönen fastest in second and third practice.

Qualifying 
Sebastian Vettel qualified on pole position with a time of 1:27.958, a new outright track record, with teammate Kimi Räikkönen second. Mercedes locked out the second row, although Lewis Hamilton subsequently took a five place grid penalty for an unscheduled gearbox change and started from ninth on the grid. Pierre Gasly made Q3 for the first time in his career, eventually qualifying in sixth. Max Verstappen started the race in fifteenth position, having been prevented from taking part in Q2 following a crash in Q1 after he lost control of his throttle as his car rode over a kerb.

Race 
At the start, Vettel got away well, leading into turn 1. Bottas overtook Raikkonen to claim 2nd, and Gasly also overtook Ricciardo to claim 4th. However, Ricciardo got 4th place back at turn 4, on the first lap. Max Verstappen made up ground on the first lap so he was behind Lewis Hamilton, who'd fallen to 10th place. The pair fought at turn 1 on lap 2, with Verstappen puncturing his left rear tyre. His teammate, Daniel Ricciardo, experienced an electrical shutdown at the same time, forcing him to retire. Brendon Hartley received a 10-second time penalty for causing a collision with Sergio Pérez. Verstappen then lost drive, also forcing him to retire from the Grand Prix. This was the first time in 8 years that both Red Bull Racing drivers retired from a Grand Prix, and the first time since the 2016 Russian Grand Prix that Red Bull did not score a point. It was also the first time since the 2010 Korean Grand Prix that neither Red Bull was classified. Hamilton overtook Fernando Alonso, Esteban Ocon and Nico Hülkenberg into one corner to move up into 6th place. He then passed Kevin Magnussen and Pierre Gasly in the next few laps to move up into 4th place.

During his second pit stop on lap 35, Kimi Räikkönen struck Ferrari tyre changer Francesco Cigarini with his left rear tyre as his car left the pit box, breaking Cigarini's tibia and fibula. The incident was caused by the Ferrari pit box's light incorrectly switching to green despite the fact that the left rear tyre had never actually been changed. After analysis, the faulty green was determined to have been caused by the pit system checking (only) if the wheel was securely fitted, and if the wheel gun had been "sufficiently active" beforehand. Räikkönen immediately stopped in the pit lane on advice over team radio and retired the car. Räikkönen's retirement promoted Lewis Hamilton to the podium, and Ferrari was subsequently fined €50,000 for an unsafe pit release.

Räikkönen's pit lane incident meant that teammate Sebastian Vettel could not carry out his second pit stop on schedule, and had to extend the stint on his soft tyres for 30% longer than the expected lifespan of the tyres, as stated by Pirelli. Towards the end of the race, with Vettel struggling with his tyres, Bottas got within DRS range of Vettel, but could not pass for the lead of the race. Pierre Gasly finished the race in P4, equalling Toro Rosso's best result in 2017, scoring Honda's best result since returning to F1 and earning him his first points in F1.

After the race, Brendon Hartley and Sergio Pérez both received 30 second time penalties for failing to maintain position on the formation lap.

Classification

Qualifying

Notes
  – Lewis Hamilton received a five-place grid penalty for an unscheduled gearbox change.
  – Fernando Alonso and Romain Grosjean set identical lap times in Q1. As Alonso was the first to set his time, he was considered to have qualified ahead of Grosjean and advanced to Q2.

Race 

Notes
  – Sergio Pérez originally finished in twelfth place but had thirty seconds added to race time for overtaking on the formation lap.
  – Brendon Hartley originally finished in thirteenth place but had thirty seconds added to race time for failing to retake his original starting position before reaching the safety-car line on the formation lap.

Championship standings after the race 

Drivers' Championship standings

Constructors' Championship standings

 Note: Only the top five positions are included for both sets of standings.

See also 

 2018 Bahrain FIA Formula 2 round

References

External links

 The race on Formula1.com

Bahrain
Bahrain Grand Prix
Grand Prix
Bahrain Grand Prix